Simone Margaret Young AM (born 2 March 1961) is an Australian conductor. She is currently chief conductor of the Sydney Symphony Orchestra.

Biography and career

Young was born in Sydney, of Irish ancestry on her father's side and Croatian ancestry on her mother's. Young was educated at the Monte Sant' Angelo Mercy College in North Sydney. She studied composition, piano and conducting at the Sydney Conservatorium of Music.

Commencing in 1983, Young worked at Opera Australia as a répétiteur under various conductors, including Charles Mackerras, Richard Bonynge, Carlo Felice Cillario and Stuart Challender. Young started her operatic conducting career at the Sydney Opera House in 1985. In 1986 she was the first woman and youngest person to be appointed a resident conductor with Opera Australia. She received an Australia Council grant to study overseas, and was named Young Australian of the Year. In her early years, she was assistant to James Conlon, and Kapellmeister, at the Cologne Opera, and assistant to Daniel Barenboim at the Berlin State Opera and the Bayreuth Festival. From 1998 until 2002, Young was principal conductor of the Bergen Philharmonic Orchestra in Norway.

From 2001 to 2003, Young was chief conductor of Opera Australia in Sydney. Her contract was not renewed after 2003, with one given reason being the excessive expense of her programming ideas.

Young made her first conducting appearance at the Hamburg State Opera in 1996. In May 2003, she was named both chief executive of the Hamburg State Opera and chief conductor of the Philharmoniker Hamburg, posts which she assumed in 2005. In 2006, she became Professor of Music and Theatre at the University of Hamburg. Critics of the magazine Opernwelt selected her in October 2006 as the Dirigentin des Jahres (Conductor of the Year). In December 2011, it was announced that Young would conclude her tenures with both the Hamburg State Opera and the Hamburg Philharmonic after the 2014/2015 season.

Young was the first female conductor at the Vienna State Opera in 1993. She conducted the Sydney Symphony Orchestra when they performed Elena Kats-Chernin's "Deep Sea Dreaming" at the 2000 Summer Olympics opening ceremony in Sydney. In November 2005, she was the first female conductor to conduct the Vienna Philharmonic. Her discography includes the complete symphonies of Anton Bruckner and the complete Ring Cycle of Richard Wagner, where she was the first female conductor to have recorded either of these cycles. She has also recorded the complete cycle of Brahms' symphonies.

In August 2008, Young appeared as part of the judging panel in the reality TV talent show-themed program Maestro on BBC Two.  In December 2012, she was voted Limelight magazine's Music Personality of the Year.

In 2013, in commemoration of the bicentenaries for Richard Wagner and for Giuseppe Verdi, Young conducted the entire 'Bayreuth canon' of ten Wagner operas at a festival entitled 'Wagner-Wahn' in Hamburg, along with three rarely performed Verdi operas as a trilogy in September to November – La battaglia di Legnano, I due Foscari, I Lombardi alla prima crociata.  In March 2016, Young was appointed a member of the board of the European Academy of Music Theatre.

Young had first guest-conducted the Sydney Symphony Orchestra (SSO) in 1996.  In December 2019, the SSO announced the appointment of Young as its next chief conductor, effective in 2022, with an initial contract of 3 years. Young is the first female conductor to be named chief conductor of the SSO.

Personal life 
Young is married to Greg Condon, and has two daughters. She made her first appearance at the Metropolitan Opera while she was five months pregnant and conducted at the Vienna State Opera one month prior to giving birth in 1997.

Media, honours and awards 
Young is featured in the documentary film Knowing the Score directed by Australian documentarian Janine Hosking, a biopic that "is first and foremost a captivating story of a dazzling 30-year music career."

Young has received honorary doctorates from the Universities of New South Wales, Sydney and Melbourne. She has been appointed a Chevalier des Arts et des Lettres of France. 
 
On 26 January 2004, in the Australia Day Honours, Young was named a Member of the Order of Australia (AM) "for service to the arts as a conductor with major opera companies and orchestras in Australia and internationally".

In 2021 Young was named the Advance Awards Global Icon.

ARIA Music Awards
The ARIA Music Awards is an annual awards ceremony that recognises excellence, innovation, and achievement across all genres of Australian music. They commenced in 1987. 

! 
|-
| 2002
| Verdi: Requiem (with Opera Australia)
| Best Original Cast or Show Album
| 
| 
|-

Bernard Heinze Memorial Award
The Sir Bernard Heinze Memorial Award is given to a person who has made an outstanding contribution to music in Australia.

! 
|-
| 2010|| Simone Young || Sir Bernard Heinze Memorial Award ||  || 
|-

Helpmann Awards
The Helpmann Awards is an awards show, celebrating live entertainment and performing arts in Australia, presented by industry group Live Performance Australia since 2001. Note: 2020 and 2021 were cancelled due to the COVID-19 pandemic.
 

! 
|-
| 2001
| Simone Young – Simon Boccanegra
| Helpmann Award for Best Musical Direction
| 
|
|-
| rowspan="2"|  2002
| Simone Young – Andrea Chénier
| Best Music Direction
| 
| rowspan="2"| 
|-
| Simone Young – Tristan und Isolde
| Best Music Direction
| 
|-
| 2004
| Simone Young – Lulu
| Best Music Direction
| 
|
|-
| 2005
| Simone Young – Simone Young Conducts Mahler 
| Helpmann Award for Best Performance in a Classical Concert
| 
|
|-
| 2008
| Simone Young – Turangalîla-Symphonie
| Best Performance in a Classical Concert
| 
|
|-
| 2013
| Simone Young conducting the Hamburg Philharmonic – The Resurrection Symphony 
| Helpmann Award for Best Individual Classical Performance
| 
|
|-
| 2018
| Simone Young Conducts the Sydney Symphony Orchestra – Beethoven and Bruckner
| Helpmann Award for  Best Symphony Orchestra Concert
| 
|
|-

Mo Awards
The Australian Entertainment Mo Awards (commonly known informally as the Mo Awards), were annual Australian entertainment industry awards. They recognise achievements in live entertainment in Australia from 1975 to 2016. Simone Young won one award in that time.
 (wins only)
|-
| 1995
| Simone Young
| Classical Performance of the Year
| 
|-

Victorian Honour Roll of Women
The Victorian Honour Roll of Women was established in 2001 to recognise the achievements of women from the Australian state of Victoria.

|-
| 2001 || Simone Young|| Victorian Honour Roll of Women||  || 
|-

Selected discography
DVD
Simone Young: To Hamburg from Downunder, documentary, directed by Ralf Pleger, Ovation, (2008)
Poulenc: Dialogues of the Carmelites, Hamburg State Opera, Arthaus Musik (2008)
Pfitzner: Palestrina, Bavarian State Orchestra, EuroArts (2010)
Reimann: Lear, Staatsoper Hamburg, Arthaus Musik (2015)

CD
Halévy: La Juive, Vienna State Opera, RCA (2002)
Wagner: Tenor Arias, Johan Botha (tenor), Vienna Radio Symphony Orchestra, Oehms Classics (2004)
Bürger: Stille der Nacht, Berlin Radio Symphony Orchestra, Toccata Classics (2006)
Hindemith: Mathis der Maler, Philharmoniker Hamburg, Oehms Classics (2007)
Britten: Folksong Arrangements, Steve Davislim (tenor), Simone Young (piano), Melba (2007)
Bruckner: Symphony No. 2, Philharmoniker Hamburg, Oehms Classics (2007)
Verdi: Requiem, Australian Opera and Ballet Orchestra, ABC Classics, (2007)
Wagner, Strauss: Transcendent Love: The Passions of Wagner and Strauss, Lisa Gasteen (soprano), West Australian Symphony Orchestra, ABC Classics (2008)
Dean: Brett Dean, Composer and Performer, Brett Dean (viola), cellos of the Sydney Symphony Orchestra, Bis (2008)
Wagner: Das Rheingold, Philharmoniker Hamburg, Oehms Classics (2008)
Bruckner: Symphony No. 3, Philharmoniker Hamburg, Oehms Classics (2008)
Wagner, Verdi, Mozart: Knut Skram, Opera Arias, Knut Skram (baritone), Royal Philharmonic Orchestra, Simax (2008)
Wagner: Die Walküre, Philharmoniker Hamburg, Oehms Classics (2009)
Bruckner: Symphony No. 8, Philharmoniker Hamburg, Oehms Classics (2009)
Brahms: Symphony No. 1, Philharmoniker Hamburg, Oehms Classics (2010)
Bruckner: Symphony No. 4 – Romantic (1874 version), Philharmoniker Hamburg, Oehms Classics (2010)
Strauss: Seduction: Songs by Richard Strauss, Steve Davislim (tenor), Orchestra Victoria, Melba Recordings (2010)
Wagner: Siegfried, Philharmoniker Hamburg, Oehms Classics (2011)
Wagner: Götterdämmerung, Philharmoniker Hamburg, Oehms Classics (2011)
Mahler: Symphony No. 2, Philharmoniker Hamburg, Oehms Classics (2012)
Mahler: Symphony No. 6, Philharmoniker Hamburg, Oehms Classics (2012)
Brahms: Symphony No. 2, Philharmoniker Hamburg, Oehms Classics (2012)
Wagner: Der Ring des Nibelungen, box set, Philharmoniker Hamburg, Oehms Classics (2012)
Bruckner: Symphony No. 0, Philharmoniker Hamburg, Oehms Classics (2013)
Brahms: Symphony No. 3 & No. 4, Philharmoniker Hamburg, Oehms Classics (2013)
Bruckner: Study Symphony in F minor, Philharmoniker Hamburg, Oehms Classics (2014)
Bruckner: Symphony No. 5 in B-flat Major, Philharmoniker Hamburg, Oehms Classics (2015)
Bruckner: Symphony No. 6, Philharmoniker Hamburg, Oehms Classics (2015)
Bruckner: Symphony No. 7, Philharmoniker Hamburg, Oehms Classics (2015)
Bruckner: Symphony No. 9, Philharmoniker Hamburg, Oehms Classics (2015)
Schmidt: The Book with Seven Seals, Philharmoniker Hamburg, NDR Chor, Staatschor Latvija, Oehms Classics (2016)
Bruckner: Complete Symphonies, box set, Philharmoniker Hamburg, Oehms Classics (2016)
Brahms: Symphonies No. 1-4, 3-CD set, Philharmoniker Hamburg, Oehms Classics (2017)
Lang: ParZeFool, Klangforum Wien, Arnold Schoenberg Chor, Kairos (2019)

Bibliography
Simone Young: Die Dirigentin: Ein portrat, Ralf Pleger, Hamburg, Europaische Verlagsanstalt, 2006 (text in German)

Notes

References

External links
 Simone Young's Discography

1961 births
20th-century Australian musicians
20th-century conductors (music)
20th-century women musicians
21st-century Australian musicians
21st-century conductors (music)
21st-century women musicians
Australian conductors (music)
Australian people of Croatian descent
Australian people of Irish descent
Chevaliers of the Ordre des Arts et des Lettres
Helpmann Award winners
Living people
Members of the Order of Australia
Music directors (opera)
Musicians from Sydney
Oehms Classics artists
People educated at Monte Sant'Angelo Mercy College
Sydney Conservatorium of Music alumni
Women conductors (music)
Academic staff of the University of Hamburg